James Macrae was a Scottish botanist.

Early life

Career

Voyage of H.M.S. Blonde
In 1824, James Macrae was sent by the Royal Horticultural Society,
aboard the H.M.S Blonde to gather botanical and agricultural information, collect plants and give seeds to Hawaiians. Another naturalist Andrew Bloxam whose brother Rowland was ship's chaplain. Ship's artist Robert Dampier also made several important paintings on the voyage. Maria Graham (later, Maria Callcott) wrote a book about the voyage of the H.M.S. Blonde including an account of the voyage and funeral ceremony for the Hawaiian sovereigns whose bodies were being returned to the Kingdom of Hawai'i.

After the specimen hunting voyage to the Kingdom of Hawai'i, Macrae was sent to Ceylon to work at the Royal Botanical Gardens, Peradeniya.

Death
James Macrae died in Ceylon (Sri Lanka) in 1830.

Written works

References

19th-century Scottish scientists
Scottish botanists